Caesar's wife can refer to:

Any of the wives of Julius Caesar
 Cossutia (disputed)
 Cornelia
 Pompeia
 Calpurnia

Works
 Caesar's Wife, a play

Other
 "Caesar's wife must be above suspicion"

See also
 :Category:Wives of Roman emperors